Address Unknown may refer to: 
 Address Unknown (novel), a 1938 short novel by Kathrine Taylor
 Address Unknown (1944 film), an American film based on Taylor's novel, directed by William Cameron Menzies
 Address Unknown (1986 film), an American film directed by John Gianvito
 Address Unknown (1997 film), an American film starring Kyle Howard 
 Address Unknown (2001 film), a South Korean film directed by Kim Ki-duk
 "Address Unknown", a 1939 No. 1 hit song by The Ink Spots
 Address Unknown, a radio program written by Ross Napier
 Address Unknown, a fictional television show in the video games Max Payne and Max Payne 2